Davy Dona (born 13 October 1981 in Choisy-le-Roi, France)  is a French karateka who won a gold medal in the men's kumite -60 kg weight class at the 2003 European Karate Championships. He also runs a dojo with his wife, Lolita.

References

1981 births
Living people
People from Choisy-le-Roi
Sportspeople from Val-de-Marne
French male karateka
Mediterranean Games bronze medalists for France
Mediterranean Games medalists in karate
Competitors at the 2005 Mediterranean Games
20th-century French people
21st-century French people